Gladys Buchanan Unger (September 16, 1884 or 1885 – May 25, 1940) was an American author who also lived in England, and who wrote plays for Broadway and the West End, as well as screenplays for Hollywood. She was the author of well over a dozen works for the London stage, Broadway, and Hollywood.

Biography
She was born either on September 16, 1884, or September 16, 1885 in San Francisco, the daughter of Frank Unger. From the age of 3, she lived in England and was educated at South Hampstead. Her initial aim was to become an artist, but she turned to play writing. She was a protegee of Charles Tyson Yerkes, and had $5000 a year from him, enabling her to live in some style in Mayfair, London. There was speculation in the American press about the nature of the relationship between them (e.g. The Oakland Tribune, 19 August 1904, quoting The Wasp). From about 1907 to 1914, she lived with her mother (critic Mrs Minnie Goodman) at Loughton in a house then called Hacienda, now Kilindini, Steeds Way, Loughton. In 1920, she married a dramatic collaborator, Kai K. Ardaschir, in London. She returned to the United States intermittently and in the 1920s, permanently, and died on May 25, 1940, at the Medical Arts Center in Manhattan at age 55.

She is buried in Woodlawn Cemetery in The Bronx, New York City.

Works authored
 Mr. Sheridan (play, produced at the Garrick Theatre, March 1907)
 The Marriage Market (1911) English adaptation
 Betty (1916)
 The Werewolf (1924) English adaptation of Der Werwolf by Rudolph Lothar
 The Heart Thief (1927)
 Dynamite (1929)
 Marianne (1929) (silent and musical versions)
 Madam Satan (1931)
 Many a Slip (1931)
 Sylvia Scarlett (1935)
 Music Is Magic (1935)
 Night of Mystery (1937)
 Daughter of Shanghai (1937)
 Paradise for Three (1938)

References

External links

 
 
 
 Gladys Unger at Flickr
 Plays by Gladys Unger on Great War Theatre

1880s births
1940 deaths
Screenwriters from California
People from Loughton
Burials at Woodlawn Cemetery (Bronx, New York)
American women screenwriters
20th-century American women writers
20th-century American dramatists and playwrights
Writers from San Francisco
American expatriates in the United Kingdom
American women dramatists and playwrights
20th-century American screenwriters